The 2017 Summit League baseball tournament took place from May 24 through 27. The top four regular season finishers of the league's six teams met in the double-elimination tournament held at J. L. Johnson Stadium on the campus of Oral Roberts in Tulsa, Oklahoma. The winner of the tournament will earn the Summit League's automatic bid to the 2017 NCAA Division I baseball tournament.

Seeding
The top four finishers from the regular season will be seeded one through four based on conference winning percentage during the double round robin regular season. The teams will then play a double elimination tournament.

Results

References

Tournament
Summit League Baseball Tournament
Summit League baseball tournament
Summit League baseball tournament